Urmila Matondkar (born 4 February 1974) is an Indian actress and politician. Known for her work primarily in Hindi films, in addition to Telugu, Malayalam, Marathi and Tamil films, she has received numerous accolades, including the Filmfare Award and the Nandi Award. Having established a distinctive on-screen persona, she is known for her style statements and dancing skills.

After making her debut as a child in the 1977 film Karm, Matondkar gained wide recognition with Masoom (1983), following which she appeared in few other films. Her first lead role came with the Malayalam film Chanakyan (1989), and her subsequent lead role in Hindi cinema with Narsimha (1991), both of which were commercial successes.

After a brief setback, Matondkar established herself as a leading actress with the romance Rangeela (1995), the drama Judaai (1997), the crime film Satya (1998), the romantic comedy Khoobsurat (1999), and the thriller Jungle (2000). She also achieved success in Telugu and Tamil cinema with starring roles in Antham (1992), Gaayam (1993), Indian (1996) and Anaganaga Oka Roju (1997). Matondkar garnered critical recognition for portraying a range of intense characters in several psychological thrillers and horror films, including a serial killer in Kaun (1999), an obsessive lover in Pyaar Tune Kya Kiya (2001), a possessed woman in Bhoot (2003) and a violent avenger in Ek Hasina Thi (2004). During these years, she collaborated with independent filmmakers in art-house cinema, including the dramas Tehzeeb (2003), Pinjar (2003), Maine Gandhi Ko Nahin Mara (2005), Bas Ek Pal (2006) and the Marathi film Ajoba (2014).

In addition to acting in films, Matondkar is involved with several humanitarian causes and is vocal about issues faced by women and children. She has participated in concert tours and stage shows, and featured as a talent judge for various dance reality shows, including Jhalak Dikhhla Jaa (2007) and  DID Super Moms (2022).

Early and personal life
Matondkar was born on 4 February 1974 
to Shrikant and Sunita Matondkar in present-day Mumbai in a Hindu Maharashtrian family. She studied at DG Ruparel College, Mumbai. She married Kashmir based businessman and model Mohsin Akhtar Mir on 3 March 2016.

Acting career

Debut and work as child artist (1977–88)
Matondkar made her film debut as a child artiste in B.R. Chopra's Karm (1977). Subsequently, she featured in Shreeram Lagoo's Marathi film Zaakol (1980), Shyam Benegal's crime Kalyug (1980), Shekhar Kapur's drama Masoom (1983), Praveen Bhatt's Bhavna (1984), K. Viswanath's Sur Sangam (1985), Rahul Rawail's Dacait (1987) and Kalpataru's Bade Ghar Ki Beti (1989) as a child star.

Adult debut and career beginnings (1989–1993)
She made her debut in 1989, with T. K. Rajeev Kumar's Malayalam blockbuster Chanakyan, opposite Kamal Haasan. Her Bollywood debut came with N. Chandra's 1991 action drama Narsimha. Upon release, the film emerged a commercial success. Matondkar played the role of Meenu S. Singh, the rebellious daughter of Baapji (played by Om Puri), a goon lord and capitalist of the city. She next starred in Rajiv Mehra's ghost comedy Chamatkar, alongside Shah Rukh Khan (1992). Her first Telugu film came with the action-crime Antham, and its Hindi bilingual Drohi opposite Nagarjuna. She played Bhavna, an ornithologist who is in love with Nagarjuna's character. Upon release, the film received positive reviews from critics. The film marked first of her many collaborations with director Ram Gopal Verma. In 1993, Matondkar appeared in Shreemaan Aashique opposite Rishi Kapoor and Bedardi opposite Ajay Devgn— both these films failed critically and commercially. Varma's Telugu political thriller Gaayam (1993) was her next release. The film garnered positive reviews, with six state Nandi Awards, and emerged a Super Hit at the box office. Matondkar's performance earned her a Nandi Award for Best Supporting Actress.

Stardom and public recognition (1994–98)
She gained wider public recognition with the 1994 hit romantic drama Aa Gale Lag Ja, starring alongside Jugal Hansraj.   
     
          
In 1995, Matondkar established herself as a leading actress of contemporary Hindi cinema by featuring in Varma's musical romance Rangeela, one of the top-grossing productions of the year. Co-starring Aamir Khan and Jackie Shroff, the film emerged as a blockbuster with a gross of 334 million. Matondkar played Mili Joshi, an effervescent fun-loving friend of a street-toughened orphan, with ambitions of becoming an actress. At the 41st Filmfare Awards, Rangeela was nominated for 12 awards including a first Best Actress nomination for Matondkar. The film was screened at the International Film Festival of India.
In the same year, she also starred alongside Mohanlal in the Malayalam action Thacholi Varghese Chekavar. She played Maya, the only witness in a homicide who is kept under house arrest by her parents.

In 1996, she played Sapna, the daughter of an RTO official in S. Shankar's Indian (1996), which marked her first Tamil film. It was also dubbed and released in Hindi under the title Hindustani. Featuring Kamal Haasan in dual roles alongside Matondkar and Manisha Koirala, it was the most expensive Indian film at that time, with a budget of 150 million. Nirupama Subramanian of India Today felt the film was a commercial potboiler and wrote, "Indian has dances, foot-tapping melodies by A. R. Rahman and two pretty women, Manisha Koirala and Urmila Matondkar". Both Indian and Hindustani were commercial successes. The film was India's official entry for the Best Foreign Language Film for the Academy Awards in 1996, but was not nominated.

Matondkar's first release of 1997 was Raj Kanwar's melodrama Judaai. A remake of the 1994 Telugu film Shubhalagnam, it tells the story of Kajal (played by Sridevi), lured by wealth who asks her husband, Raj (played by Anil Kapoor), an honest engineer, to marry Janhvi (played by Matondkar), the rich daughter of his boss. The Indian Express asserted that "it is Urmila Matondkar who comes out with flying colours". The film emerged as a commercial success and her performance fetched her a Filmfare Best Supporting Actress Award nomination. Her next releases were the crime comedy Daud alongside Sanjay Dutt, the romantic drama Mere Sapno Ki Rani alongside Sanjay Kapoor and the action romance Aflatoon alongside Akshay Kumar. All these films underperformed at the box-office. She next reunited with Varma for her third Telugu release, the road movie Anaganaga Oka Roju, starring alongside J. D. Chakravarthy. The film involves the comic travails of a couple eloping, on the run from their parents who get entangled as murder suspects of a politician, in a police and political mafia road hunt for an incriminating audio tape. The film received positive reviews and emerged as a box office hit.

Her next release was the crime Satya, for which she received another Filmfare Best Actress nomination. The film was received favourably by critics and was a huge hit at the box office, solidifying Matondkar's position as a leading lady of Bollywood. Satya was on CNN-IBN's 2013 list of the 100 greatest Indian films of all time, in the 100 Filmfare Days series and on the "70 iconic movies of independent India" list. It was mentioned in Rachel Dwyer's 100 Bollywood Films (where she called it a "masterpiece"), and in critic and author Shubhra Gupta's 50 Films That Changed Bollywood, 1995-2015.

Professional expansion and success (1999–2003)
In 1999, Matondkar had six film releases; four of them − Jaanam Samjha Karo, Hum Tum Pe Marte Hain, Mast and Dillagi − were commercial failures. However, Matondkar's performances were generally well received by critics, (nn a review for Jaanam Samjha Karo, Rediff stating, "Urmila is just about the only heroine who can give Karisma a run for her money when it comes to pelvic thrusts").
Her first hit that year was Varma's psychological horror thriller Kaun, opposite Manoj Bajpayee, where she played a nameless character. Khalid Mohamed of The Times of India (who would later cast her in Tehzeeb) wrote, "She rivets the viewer's interest, carrying off entire reels on her shoulders, through a gamut of quicksilver facial expressions. Vulnerable and baffled, she is utterly believable as the traumatised girl-next-door".
Matondkar next played the love interest of Sanjay Dutt's character in the action comedy Khoobsurat. It emerged as a box-office hit.

During the 2000s, Matondkar revealed strong, dramatic and psychological features in her roles, and delivered a number of critically acclaimed performances. In 2000, Matondkar re-united with Varma for the action Jungle, alongside Fardeen Khan and Sunil Shetty. She played Anu, who is hostaged by the chief of bandits, when he starts liking her. Taran Adarsh of Bollywood Hungama wrote, "Urmila Matondkar is at ease in a role that gives her ample scope to showcase her talent. Her scenes with Durga can easily be singled out, for they have been shot with brilliance." The film was both critically and commercially successful. She next starred opposite Govinda in David Dhawan's romantic comedy Kunwara.

The next year, Matondkar portrayed Ria, an obsessed lover, in Rajat Mukherjee's romantic thriller Pyaar Tune Kya Kiya, a film which received critical acclaim. Her performance was highly acclaimed and several critics noted her for showing great emotional range and depth. Taran Adarsh of Bollywood Hungama, in a positive review wrote, "the 'actual hero' of the film is definitely Urmila Matondkar, who will walk away with all laurels at the end of the day. Her career-best performance, she oozes intensity, love, hate, relentlessness and obsessive behaviour with perfection. And despite the fact that her character gets nuttier as the movie tags along, it is to Urmila's credit that we are able to feel for her pathetic persona." Planetbollywood.com described Matondkar as: "The star of the show is Urmila who is simply mind blowing in this film. The film is sure to get her nominated for best actress or even in some cases best villain. Not only does she look amazing, but she acts so well it will leave you speechless. If you hate everything else in the film, her performance will surely win you over! Her last two scenes in the film are simply breath taking. Ladies and gentlemen stand up and applaud this fantastic performance!" Matondkar received various Best Villain nominations for her performance, including a Filmfare Award for Best Performance in a Negative Role nomination.

In 2002, Matondkar appeared alongside an ensemble cast (Waheeda Rehman, Anil Kapoor, Fardeen Khan, Mahima Chaudhary, Abhishek Bachchan and Tara Sharma), in the drama Om Jai Jagadish. She played the role of Neetu, the love interest of the protagonist (played by Fardeen Khan). The film failed commercially. Anees Bazmee's psychological thriller Deewangee was her next release. She played Sargam, a popular singer, who is the object of conflict between the protagonist and antagonist. Co-starring Ajay Devgan and Akshaye Khanna, the film was well received by critics and was moderately successful at the box office. Deepa Gumaste, writing for Rediff, praised the performances of the three leads and wrote: "As usual, the heroine has little to do apart from looking cute in the first half and scared in the second. It is another matter that she is supposed to be the object of the film's conflict. For what it is worth, Urmila Matondkar executes her part well".

Her first release of 2003 was the supernatural horror Bhoot. She played Swati, a ghost-possessed woman. Taran Adarsh wrote praised her performance and wrote: "...the film clearly belongs to Urmila Matondkar all the way. To state that she is excellent would be doing gross injustice to her work. Sequences when she is possessed are simply astounding. If this performance doesn't deserve an award, no other performance should. It beats all competition hollow". Khalid Mohamed wrote, "Matondkar is consistently excellent - controlled and persuasively vulnerable – as the beleaguered wife, evoking your concern and empathy. She's the major triumph of Bhoot actually". She received her first Filmfare Award under the Best Actress (Critics' Choice) as well as various Best Actress awards at different award ceremonies, including Star Screen Awards, Zee Cine Awards and Bollywood Movie Awards. She received another Filmfare Award for Best Actress nomination and also received the national honour Rajiv Gandhi Award for the work in the film, also recognising her achievements in Bollywood.

She achieved further critical acclaim for her portrayal of the title role of a girl in a strained relationship with her mother, in Khalid Mohammed's crime drama Tehzeeb (2003). Rediff complimented her by stating, "Urmila as the emotionally scarred Tehzeeb, who is uncomfortable expressing her feelings even to her husband, has done a commendable job. The only person she expresses her love to is her mentally challenged sister."
She next played the role of Puro, a North Indian girl who leads a happy life but her dreams of a happy future are shattered when, one evening, she is kidnapped by Bajpayee's character, in the background of the 1947 India partition in the critically acclaimed Pinjar (2003). Derek Elley of Variety reviewed the film commenting, "A handsomely shot drama centered on a Hindu woman's travails during the 1947 Partition, "Pinjar" ranks as one of the better Bollywood treatments of this still hot-button issue. Good performances, especially by lead actress Urmila Matondkar and by Manoj Bajpai as her Muslim partner, compensate for a slightly wobbly structure".

Critical acclaim and decrease in workload (2004–present)
In 2004, Matondkar starred in the thriller Ek Hasina Thi. The film (which marked the debut of Sriram Raghavan) tells the story of a Sarika Vartak, a deceived woman, played by Matondkar, who is jailed and arrested for having links with the underworld, because of her lover, played by Khan, and later flees from prison to seek revenge on him. Upon release, the film was positively received by critics, with Matondkar's performance earning praise. The Deccan Herald commented: "An author-backed role ensures that Urmila gets to do everything just right. Whether it's kicking a bully into shape in the dreary prison of which she's an inmate or whether it's making nice with Karan while plotting his ruin, she's a total treat. She carries off the transition from naive to knowing effortlessly. Seductive and steely, she's quite explosive." The film was a box office success. For her performance, Matondkar received nominations at the Filmfare, Screen, Zee Cine and IIFA ceremonies. The film was premiered at the New York Asian Film Festival.

In 2005, she played the title role in the horror Naina. The film tells the story of Matondkar's character who after receiving an eye transplant, realises that she can see into the supernatural world. The film was premiered in the Marché du Film section at the 2005 Cannes Film Festival. She next starred as Trisha Chaudhary, a caring daughter of Professor Uttam Chaudhary, played by Anupam Kher, in Jahnu Barua's art drama Maine Gandhi Ko Nahin Mara. The film was well received by critics, with Rediff stating, "Her credibility as a versatile actress is further established in her reserved albeit realistic delivery of emotions." Matondkar won her second Bollywood Movie Award for Best Actress. In 2006, she appeared in Pankaj Parashar's romance Banaras: A Mystic Love Story with Ashmit Patel and Dimple Kapadia. The film was not well received by critics, with Raja Sen commenting: "And then there's Urmila. Let's start with the good. She looks great, refreshingly beautiful and striking. That's about it. This is an actress who has worked hard to earn respectability, but this role, like the film itself, suffers from inconsistency". Her next release was Onir's Bas Ek Pal (2006).

Her next release was the thriller Karzzzz (2008), a remake of Karz (1980), alongside Himesh Reshammiya. The film was a major critical and commercial failure, however, Matondkar was praised for her portrayal and adding her own flavour to the role of Kamini. The same year, she re-united with Sanjay Dutt for EMI. In 2012, she provided her voice to the role of Begum in the computer-animated comedy Delhi Safari.

Matondkar made her Marathi film debut with Ajoba in 2014. She portrayed Purva Rao, a wildlife activist in search of leopards. Daily News and Analysis wrote, "..this one's another jewel in her crown. She portrays Purva with a mild aggressive and rebellious streak. But all of these are an undercurrent to Purva's actions." After a four-year hiatus, Matondkar made a special appearance in a song of the dark comedy Blackmail (2018).

Off-screen work
In addition to her acting career, Matondkar has participated in several stage shows and televised award ceremonies. 
In 2007, she lent her voice for Asha Bhonsle's album Asha and Friends Vol 1, where she performed with Bhonsle for a duet song "Mehbooba Dilruba". Later that year, she featured as a talent judge for the second season of Sony Entertainment's dance reality show Jhalak Dikhhla Jaa alongside Jeetendra and Shiamak Davar. She described her experience of judging Jhalak Dikhhla Jaa  by saying, "I'm ecstatic about being able to be part of this show. I was facing the participants and audience for the first time. There were no written lines, no cues, no second chances. Either it worked or it didn't work for you. It was a concept that I liked."

In 2008, Matondkar presented Sony TV's singing reality show Waar Parriwar. 
In 2011, she co-judged Colors' dance reality show Chak Dhoom Dhoom, along with Javed Jaffrey and Terence Lewis and in 2012, she featured as one of the jury of Zee Marathi's Dance Maharashtra Dance, where the dancers from Maharashtra demonstrated their dancing prowess through different dance forms.

During her years in the film industry, Matondkar has been involved in different charitable organisations and has particularly supported women's causes in India. In February 2013, Matondkar along with Parineeti Chopra, walked for Manish Malhotra in London, England, to support the Angeli Foundation – a charity that works to empower the Girl Child in India. She has walked the runway for designers such as Manish Malhotra and Rohit Verma.

Political career
Matondkar joined the Indian National Congress on 27 March 2019. She contested from Mumbai North constituency in the 2019 Lok Sabha Election, but lost. On 10 September 2019, she resigned from the party, citing petty internal politics. On 1 December 2020, she joined Shiv Sena in presence of party president Uddhav Thackeray. Shiv Sena hoped to add a nationally recognised face and voice, well conversant in Marathi, Hindi as well as English, to represent the party.

Artistry and media image

Matondkar has been described by critics as one of the most talented actresses and has been praised for her dancing skills. In 2016, film critic Subhash K. Jha praised her work.

Film critic Sukanya Verma has described Matondkar as "a thinking actress who performs spontaneously." She further added,"..It is her charismatic image that stays with the audience. She is an actress with a lot of style and a fair amount of substance." Director Ram Gopal Varma, describing her as someone who impacted him, commented, "I was mesmerised by Urmila's beauty -- from her face to her figure... everything about her was just divine...One of my primary motives in making Rangeela was to capture Urmila's beauty eternally on camera and to make it a benchmark for sex symbols." Saurav Bhanot of Scoop Whoop wrote, "Breaking Bollywood stereotypes of how heroines should be on-screen, Urmila was always ahead of her times. With Rangeela, Urmila single-handedly redefined the 90s Bollywood heroine." In an interview with Rediff, Matondkar described her approach to acting:

I have always tried to make life interesting for myself by doing different roles that connect mainstream cinema with its offbeat counterpart. I guess I have been daring and lucky with my roles. I want to do every kind of role with a reasonable amount of panache. I want to be a fair combination of style and substance.
In 2003, following the success of Bhoot, Pinjar and Tehzeeb, Matondkar featured in Rediff's annual Top Bollywood actresses listing. Planetbollywood.com described Matondkar as "a force to reckon with in the industry".

Filmography and awards

See also
 List of Indian film actresses
 List of Hindi film actresses

References

External links

 
 

1974 births
Living people
Actresses from Mumbai
Indian film actresses
Actresses in Malayalam cinema
Actresses in Marathi cinema
Indian child actresses
Actresses in Hindi cinema
Indian women television presenters
Indian television presenters
20th-century Indian actresses
21st-century Indian actresses
Actresses in Telugu cinema
Actresses in Tamil cinema
Filmfare Awards winners
Screen Awards winners
Zee Cine Awards winners
Child actresses in Marathi cinema
Indian actor-politicians